Dr. Ambedkar College, Nagpur, established in 1964, is one of the oldest general degree colleges in Nagpur, Maharashtra. This college offers different courses in science, arts and commerce. It is affiliated to Rashtrasant Tukadoji Maharaj Nagpur University.

Departments

Science
Physics
Chemistry
Mathematics
Statistics
Biochemistry
Biotechnology
Botany
Zoology
Computer Science

Arts and Commerce
Marathi
English
History
Political Science
Economics
Sanskrit
Sociology
Psychology
Philosophy
Management
Commerce
Law

Accreditation
The college is  recognized by the University Grants Commission (UGC).

NAAC A Grade College

References

External links

Colleges affiliated to Rashtrasant Tukadoji Maharaj Nagpur University
Educational institutions established in 1964
1964 establishments in Bihar
Universities and colleges in Maharashtra
Universities and colleges in Nagpur